Mack Daddy is an album by the rapper Sir Mix-a-Lot.

Mack Daddy may refer to:

MacDaddy, a slang term for a pimp, which has come to mean a virile man
Mac Daddy, a member of the rap duo Kris Kross
"Mac Daddy", an episode of Foster's Home for Imaginary Friends
Ozone Mac Daddy Bi, a French two-place paraglider design